The Health and Disability Commissioner Act  is an Act of Parliament passed in New Zealand in 1994. Thus, since 1994, New Zealand has protected the rights of the disabled under the Act including rights to respect, freedom from discrimination and coercion, dignity, communication in a language the resident can understand, information and informed consent, and right of complaint.

See also 

 Health care in New Zealand
 Euthanasia in New Zealand

References

External links 
 Health and Disability Commissioner Act 1994 - text of the Act

Statutes of New Zealand
Health law in New Zealand
1994 in New Zealand law